L=A=N=G=U=A=G=E was an avant-garde poetry magazine edited by Charles Bernstein and Bruce Andrews that ran thirteen issues from February 1978 to October 1981. Along with This, it is the magazine most often referenced as the breeding ground for the group of writers who became known as the Language poets.

References

Bibliography

External links
 L=A=N=G=U=A=G=E Magazine online archive
 'Meaning, Unmeaning and the Poetics of L=A=N=G=U=A=G=E', article by Suman Chakraborty
"L=A=N=G=U=A=G=E P=O=E=T=R=Y", poetry previews
https://web.archive.org/web/20131021134226/http://www.poets.org/viewmedia.php/prmMID/5661

Alternative magazines
Poetry magazines published in the United States
Avant-garde magazines
Defunct literary magazines published in the United States
Language poets
Magazines established in 1978
Magazines disestablished in 1981